French North Africa (sometimes abbreviated to ANF) is the term often applied to the territories controlled by France in the North African Maghreb during the colonial era, namely Algeria, Morocco and Tunisia. In contrast to French West Africa and French Equatorial Africa which existed as federations of French colonies and administrative entities in their own right, French North Africa was never more than a term of convenience to refer to the three separately governed territories under different forms of colonial regime.

In the 19th century, the decline of the Ottoman Empire, which had loosely controlled the area since the 16th century, left the region vulnerable to other forces. In 1830, French troops captured Algiers and from 1848 until independence in 1962, France treated Algeria as an integral part of France, the Métropole or metropolitan France. In subsequent decades, a substantial European settler population emerged in Algeria known as the Pieds-Noirs. Seeking to expand their influence beyond Algeria, the French established protectorates to the east and west of it. The French protectorate of Tunisia was established in 1881, following a swift military invasion, and the French protectorate in Morocco in 1912, following a prolonged military campaign. These lasted until 1956 when both protectorates gained full independence, Tunisia on 20 March and Morocco on 7 April.

French rule in North Africa was finally ended as a result of the Algerian War (1954-62) and the Évian Accords of March 1962 which enabled the Algerian independence referendum of July 1962. Algeria formally became independent the same month.

See also
 Army of Africa (France)
 French Colonial Empire
 French conquest of Algeria
 Pacification of Algeria
 Nationalism and resistance in Algeria
 Declaration of 1 November 1954
 Tunisian National Movement 
 Proclamation of Independence of Morocco

Notes

Further reading
Edwards, Albert, Sketches of French North Africa (2009)
Gottmann, Jean, Economic problems of French North Africa (1943)*Liebesny, Herbert J., The Government of French North Africa (1943)
Thomas, Martin, French Empire Between the Wars (2005)
Wallerstein, Immanuel M., Africa: The Politics of Independence and Unity (1961)

History of North Africa
French colonisation in Africa
1830 establishments in the French colonial empire
1830 establishments in Africa
1962 disestablishments in Africa
1962 disestablishments in the French colonial empire
States and territories established in 1830
States and territories disestablished in 1962